Ren Ziwei (born 3 June 1997) is a Chinese short track speed-skater. He won a bronze medal in men's 1500 meters in 2014 World Junior Championships in Erzurum, Turkey. With his three teammates Chen Guang, Xu Fu and Sui Xin, he also won the gold medal in men's 3000 meter relay race.

References

External links

1997 births
Living people
Sportspeople from Harbin
Chinese male short track speed skaters
Olympic short track speed skaters of China
Olympic gold medalists for China
Olympic silver medalists for China
Olympic medalists in short track speed skating
Short track speed skaters at the 2018 Winter Olympics
Short track speed skaters at the 2022 Winter Olympics
Medalists at the 2018 Winter Olympics
Medalists at the 2022 Winter Olympics
Asian Games medalists in short track speed skating
Asian Games gold medalists for China
Short track speed skaters at the 2017 Asian Winter Games
Medalists at the 2017 Asian Winter Games
World Short Track Speed Skating Championships medalists
21st-century Chinese people